Jones Island State Park is a Washington state park coterminous with Jones Island, one of the San Juan Islands in San Juan County, Washington, USA. It is located one mile (1.6 km) west of the southwestern corner of Orcas Island and accessible only by boat. The island was named by the Wilkes Expedition in 1841 for naval officer Jacob Jones.

Activities and amenities
The park features a dock, four miles of hiking trails, and 24 primitive campsites, two of which are reserved for non-motorized voyagers traveling along the Cascadia Marine Trail. The park's population of black-tail deer have become accustomed to human presence and will allow themselves to be fed by hand, which activity is, however, illegal.

How to get there

Jones Island can be reached by personal watercraft.  On the north side there seven mooring buoys and 128 linear feet of dock moorage at the North Cove. The removal of the moorage dock at North Cove begins in October and installation begins at the end of March. Mooring buoys are available year-round. On the south side there are some secure anchorage points, although knowledge of tides, currents and bottom depth should be taken into account.
Kayakers should also be aware of the dramatic tidal exchanges, weather conditions and possibility of the campsite to be booked out by tours.

References

External links
Jones Island State Park Washington State Parks and Recreation Commission

Uninhabited islands of Washington (state)
Parks in San Juan County, Washington
State parks of Washington (state)
San Juan Islands